Ben Leong (born 20 January 1986) is a Malaysian professional golfer.

Leong won the Asian Tour qualifying school in 2006, and after a poor debut season won again in 2007. His 2008 form was much improved, and he claimed his first tour win at the Worldwide Selangor Masters. Since then he has played on the Asian Tour full-time, with a best Order of Merit finish of 25th in 2008.

Amateur wins
2003 Southeast Asia Amateur Championship
2005 Southeast Asia Amateur Championship

Professional wins (6)

Asian Tour wins (1)

Asian Development Tour wins (2)

1Co-sanctioned by the Professional Golf of Malaysia Tour

ASEAN PGA Tour wins (1)

Other wins (2)
2008 Terengganu Masters 
2014 I&P Group Closed Championship

Team appearances
Amateur
Eisenhower Trophy (representing Malaysia): 2004, 2006
Bonallack Trophy (representing Asia/Pacific): 2004 (winners), 2006

Professional
World Cup (representing Malaysia): 2018

External links

Malaysian male golfers
UCF Knights men's golfers
Asian Tour golfers
Golfers at the 2006 Asian Games
Asian Games competitors for Malaysia
People from Sabah
1986 births
Living people